Martí Ventolrà i Fort (16 December 1906 — 5 June 1977) was a former Spanish footballer.  He formed part of the forward set up of FC Barcelona which also included Raich, Escolà, Fernandez and Munlloch. He represented Spain at the 1934 FIFA World Cup.

Career
Born in Barcelona, Ventolrà began playing youth football with local sides Fortpienc and Catalunya de Les Cortes. His first senior contract was with RCD Espanyol, and Ventolrà made his competitive debut for the club in 1925. He played for Espanyol through the 1929–30 La Liga season, winning the 1928–29 Copa del Rey during his time with the club.

A spell with Sevilla FC followed, and then Ventolrà joined his hometown's club FC Barcelona. He won the Campionat de Catalunya twice with Barcelona, and scored 31 goals in 58 La Liga matches, including scoring four goals against Real Madrid on 21 April 1935.

In 1937, Ventolrà emigrated to Mexico during the Spanish Civil War. He is the father of the Mexican footballer José Vantolrá.

Personal
While he was playing football in Mexico, Ventolrà married Josefina Rangel Cárdenas, the granddaughter of Mexico's President Lázaro Cárdenas. They had four children, Martín, Pepe, Guadelupe and Jorge. Martín and Pepe were professional footballers who played for Deportivo Toluca F.C., and Pepe played for Mexico at the 1970 FIFA World Cup finals.

Ventolrà's brother Josep was also a footballer who played for FC Barcelona.

References

External links

 Martí Ventolrà at camisetasclubes.com
Stats at LFP
Profile

1906 births
1977 deaths
Spain international footballers
La Liga players
Liga MX players
FC Barcelona players
Sevilla FC players
RCD Espanyol footballers
Atlante F.C. footballers
Naturalized citizens of Mexico
1934 FIFA World Cup players
Spanish emigrants to Mexico
Footballers from Barcelona
Real Club España footballers
Association football midfielders
Spanish footballers
Spanish expatriate footballers
Expatriate footballers in Mexico
Spanish expatriate sportspeople in Mexico